Rebel A. Cole is the Lynn Eminent Scholar Professor of Finance in the College of Business at Florida Atlantic University in Boca Raton, Florida, where he has taught since August 2016. He teaches graduate-level classes in corporate finance and financial institutions.

Personal life
Cole was born in Asheville, North Carolina on August 25, 1958 to Frank Allen Cole and Kathleen Krahenbuhl Godwin Cole. He attended St. Genevieve-Gibbons Hall for primary school, the Asheville School and Asheville High School for high school, and the University of North Carolina at Chapel Hill for college and graduate School. From UNC, he received an A.B. in Economics, Industrial Relations, and Political Science in May 1981 and a Ph.D. in Business Administration with specialization in Finance in May 1988. His sister is the lawyer Franchelle Millender, and his half-sister is the author Gail Godwin. In 2006, he married the author Caroline Lee in Nashville, TN. They lived in the Chicago Loop from 2006 until 2016, when they moved to Delray Beach, Florida.

Career
After receiving his PhD in Business Administration from the University of North Carolina at Chapel Hill, Cole began his career in late 1987 as a financial economist at the Federal Home Loan Bank Board, during the height of the savings & loan crisis. Here, he began a series of scholarly articles on the failures of thrift institutions, which he continued from 1989 - 1991 as a financial economist at the Federal Reserve Bank of Dallas. Cole returned to Washington in 1991 as a supervisory financial analyst in the Division of Banking Supervision & Regulation at the Federal Reserve Board where he led the development of SEER—the Fed's statistical early warning system for bank failures. After completing development of SEER in 1993, Cole transferred to the Board's Division of Research & Statistics, where he was the co-principal investigator of the 1993 National Survey of Small Business Finance. In this position, he began what has become more than 25 years of research on the availability of credit to small firms. After completion of the survey in 1997, Cole spent one year as Chief Economist of the Employment Policies Institute in Washington D.C. before returning to academia as a professor of finance at the University of Auckland in New Zealand. After two year, Cole moved to Sydney, Australia to take a professorship at the University of New South Wales—Australia's flagship university. He remained at UNSW until July 2003, when he moved back to the U.S. for a professorship at DePaul University in Chicago, where he remained until August 2016. In August 2016, he took his current position at FAU. Since leaving the Fed in 1997, Cole also began a second career as a special advisor to the International Monetary Fund, the World Bank, and the Asian Development Bank, providing training to central bankers primarily on issues related to banking supervision. In this capacity, he has led or participated in more than 70 international missions to central banks in more than 50 countries.

Cole is a prolific author who, according to Google Scholar, has written more than 100 articles that have been cited by other scholars more than 10,000 times and have appeared in such leading academic journals as The Journal of Finance, the Journal of Financial Economics, the Journal of Financial and Quantitative Analysis, the Journal of Financial Intermediation and the Journal of Corporate Finance. He is best known for his works on agency costs & ownership structure and the access to credit by privately held firms. His research interests focus on corporate governance, entrepreneurship, financial institutions and real estate.

In addition to academic pursuits, Cole has been a frequent commentator in the media about the Covid-19 pandemic. Although, he caused a brief media frenzy by spreading misinformation regarding Florida's COVID-19 positivity rate by failing to properly read the daily report published by the FL Dept of Health, assuming lab test results posted in the report were daily numbers when they were year-to-date numbers. 

He is a co-developer of a popular Covid-19 tracker website for the state of Florida, which provides comprehensive and intuitive charts on Florid Covid-19 testing, hospitalizations and deaths.

Cole also has been an active commentator in the media. During his career, he has been interviewed for and cited in stories in the Wall Street Journal,

 the New York Times, 

 the Washington Post, 

 Forbes Magazine, 

 the American Banker, Bloomberg,
 the Chicago Tribune, the Huffington Post, NPR's All Things Considered,
 Voice of America News, the Washington Times, and Yahoo Finance. 

He has appeared in television interviews on CNN,
 First Business News, Fox Business News, the PBS Nightly Business Report, NBC's Today Show, as well as on local Chicago and Florida stations.

Bibliography: Refereed Publications
 Cole, Rebel A. and Jason Damm. 2020. How did the financial crisis affect small-business lending in the U.S.? Journal of Financial Research, In Press. 
 Cole, Rebel A., Travis Davidson, and Hongxia Wang. 2020. Why do bank holding companies purchase bank-owned life insurance. Review of Quantitative Finance and Accounting, In Press. 
 Cole, Rebel A., Iannos Floros, and Vladimir Ivanov. 2019. Reducing uncertainty through a two-stage IPO. Journal of Financial Intermediation, 38, 45-57. 
 Cole, Rebel A. and Tatyana Sokolyk. 2018. Debt financing, survival and growth of start-up firms. Journal of Corporate Finance 50, 609-625.
 Dai, Na, Vladimir Ivanov, and Rebel A. Cole. 2017. Entrepreneurial Optimism, Credit Availability, and Cost of Financing: Evidence from U.S. Small Businesses. Journal of Corporate Finance 44, 289-307.
 Cole, Rebel A. and Lawrence J. White. 2017. When time is not on our side: The costs of regulatory forbearance in the closure of insolvent banks.  Journal of Banking and Finance 80, 235-249.
 Cole, Rebel A. and Tatyana Sokolyk. 2016. Who needs credit and who gets credit? Evidence from the Surveys of Small Business Finances. Journal of Financial Stability 24, 40-60.
 Cole, Rebel A., Douglas Cumming, and Dan Li. 2016. Do banks or VCs spur growth? Journal of International Financial Markets, Institutions, and Money 41, 60-72.
 Cole, Rebel A. and Hamid Mehran. 2016. What do we know about executive compensation at small privately held firms? Small Business Economics 46, 215–237.
 Chernykh, Lucy and Rebel A. Cole. 2015. How should we measure bank capital adequacy? A simple proposal. Journal of Financial Stability 20, 131-143.
 Roddewig, Richard J., and Rebel A. Cole. 2014. Real estate value impacts from fracking: Industry response and proper analytical techniques. Real Estate Issues 39 (3), 6-20.
 Berkman, Henk, Rebel A. Cole and Lawrence J. Fu. 2014. Improving corporate governance where the State is the controlling block holder: Evidence from China. European Journal of Finance 20, 752-777.
 Cole, Rebel A. 2013. What do we know about the capital structure of privately held firms? Evidence from the Surveys of Small Business Finances. Financial Management 45, 777-813.
 Cole, Rebel A. and Lawrence J. White. 2012. Déjà Vu all over again: The causes of U.S. commercial bank failures this time around. Journal of Financial Services Research 42, 5-29.
 Cannon, Susanne E. and Rebel A. Cole. 2011. How accurate are commercial real-estate appraisal? Evidence from 25 years of NCREIF data. Journal of Portfolio Management 35 (5), 68-88.
 Cannon, Susanne E. and Rebel A. Cole. 2011. Changes in REIT liquidity: Evidence from daily data 1988-2007. Journal of Real Estate Finance and Economics 43, 258-280.
 Chernykh, Lucy and Rebel A. Cole. 2011. Does deposit insurance improve financial intermediation? Evidence from the Russian experiment. Journal of Banking & Finance 35, 388-402.
 Ang, James S., Rebel A. Cole and Dan Lawson. 2010. The role of owner in capital structure decisions: An analysis of single-owner corporations. Journal of Entrepreneurial Finance 14, 1 36.
 Berkman, Henk, Rebel A. Cole and Lawrence J. Fu. 2010. Political connections and minority-shareholder protection: Evidence from securities-market regulation in China. Journal of Financial & Quantitative Analysis 45, 1391-1417.
 Berkman, Henk, Rebel A. Cole and Lawrence J. Fu. 2009. Expropriation through loan guarantees to related parties: Evidence from China. Journal of Banking & Finance 33, 141-156.
 Cole, Rebel A., Fariborz Moshirian and Qionbing Wu. 2008. Bank stock returns and economic growth. Journal of Banking & Finance 32, 996-1007.
 Cole, Rebel A. 2007. Henderson Global Investors: Institutional investments in real estate. Journal of Real Estate Practice and Education 10, 107-122.
 Cole, Rebel A., Lawrence G. Goldberg and Lawrence J. White. 2004. Cookie-cutter versus character: The micro structure of small-business lending by large and small banks. Journal of Financial & Quantitative Analysis 39, 227-251.
 Ang, James, Rebel A. Cole and James Lin. 2000. Agency costs and ownership structure. The Journal of Finance 55, 81-106.
 Cole, Rebel A. and Hamid Mehran. 1998. The effect of changes in ownership structure on performance: Evidence from the thrift industry. Journal of Financial Economics 50, 291-317.
 Cole, Rebel A. 1998. The importance of relationships to the availability of credit. Journal of Banking & Finance 22, 959-997.
 Cole, Rebel A. and Jeffery W. Gunther. 1998. Predicting bank failures: A comparison of on- and off-site monitoring systems. Journal of Financial Services Research 13, 103-117.
 Bhasin, Vijay, Rebel A. Cole and Joseph K. Kiely. 1997. Changes in REIT liquidity 1990-94: Evidence from intra-day transactions. Real Estate Economics 25, 615-630.
 Eisenbeis, Robert A., Paul M. Horvitz and Rebel A. Cole. 1996. Commercial banks and real estate lending: The Texas experience. Journal of Regulatory Economics 10, 275-290.
 Cole, Rebel A. and Robert A. Eisenbeis. 1996. The role of principal-agent problems in the 1980s thrift crisis. Real Estate Economics 24, 195-218.
 Cole, Rebel A. and Jeffery W. Gunther. 1995. Separating the likelihood and timing of bank failure. Journal of Banking& Finance 19, 1073-1089.
 Fenn, George W. and Rebel A. Cole. 1994. Announcements of asset-quality problems and contagion effects in the life insurance industry. Journal of Financial Economics 35, 181-198.
 Cole, Rebel A. and Joseph A. McKenzie. 1994. Thrift asset-class returns and efficient diversification of thrift institution portfolios. Real Estate Economics (formerly Journal of the American Real Estate and Urban Economics Association) 22, 95-116.
 Cole, Rebel A., Robert A. Eisenbeis and Joseph A. McKenzie. 1994. Asymmetric-information and principal-agent problems as sources of value in FSLIC-assisted acquisitions of thrift institutions. Journal of Financial Services Research 8, 5-28.
 Cole, Rebel A. 1993. When are thrift institutions closed? An agency-theoretic model. Journal of Financial Services Research 7, 283-307.
 McKenzie, Joseph A., Rebel A. Cole and Richard A. Brown. 1992. Moral hazard, portfolio allocation, and asset returns for thrift institutions. Journal of Financial Services Research 5, 315-339.
 Curry, Timothy, Joseph Blalock and Rebel Cole. 1991. Recoveries on distressed real estate and the relative efficiency of public versus private management. Real Estate Economics (formerly Journal of the American Real Estate and Urban Economics Association) 19, 495-515.
 Miles, Mike, Rebel Cole and David Guilkey. 1990. A different look at commercial real estate returns. Real Estate Economics (formerly Journal of the American Real Estate and Urban Economics Association) 18, 403-430.
 Guilkey, David, Mike Miles and Rebel Cole. 1989. The motivations for institutional real estate sales and implications for generalizing from specific property sales to asset class returns. Real Estate Economics (formerly Journal of the American Real Estate and Urban Economics Association) 17, 70-86.
 Cole, Rebel, David Guilkey, Mike Miles and Brian Webb. 1989. More scientific diversification categories in commercial real estate. Real Estate Review, Spring, 59-66.
 Cole, Rebel, David Guilkey and Mike Miles. 1987. Pension fund investment managers’ unit values deserve confidence. Real Estate Review, Spring. 84-89.
 Cole, Rebel, David Guilkey and Mike Miles. 1986. Towards an assessment of the reliability of commercial appraisals. The Appraisal Journal, July, 422-432.

Bibliography: Non-Refereed Publications
 Cole, Rebel A. 2018. How did bank small-business lending in the U.S. change after the financial crisis? U.S. Small Business Administration Research Study No. 439. Available at: http://www.sba.gov/advocacy/7540/361941
 Cole, Rebel A. and Sarah Covington. 2016. An assessment of financial sector development in Bhutan. ADB South Asia Working Paper No. 44.
 Cole, Rebel A. 2014. Credit scoring and credit-market outcomes:  Evidence from the SSBF and KFS. U.S. Small Business Administration Research Study No. 419. Available at: https://www.sba.gov/sites/default/files/files/rs419tot.pdf
 Cole, Rebel A. 2012. How did the financial crisis affect small-business lending in the U.S.? U.S. Small Business Administration Research Study No. 399. Available at: http://www.sba.gov/advocacy/7540/361941
 Cole, Rebel A. 2012. Availability of credit to small firms young and old.  In The Oxford Handbook of Entrepreneurial Finance, edited by Douglas Cumming. Oxford University Press. 305-340. Available at: https://books.google.com/books?id=i_eI2o_N66wC&pg=PA305
 Cole, Rebel A. 2011. How do firms choose legal form of organization? U.S. Small Business Administration Research Study No. 383. Available at:  http://www.sba.gov/sites/default/files/files/rs383tot.pdf.
  Cole, Rebel A. 2010. Bank credit, trade credit or no credit? Evidence from the Surveys of Small Business Finances.  U.S. Small Business Administration Research Study No. 365. Available at:  http://www.sba.gov/advo/research/rs365.pdf.
 Cole, Rebel A. 2009. Who needs credit and who gets credit? Evidence from the Surveys of Small Business Finances. In Small Business in Focus: Finance. A Compendium of Research by the Small Business Administration Office of Advocacy, July, 95-133. Available at http://www.sba.gov/ADVO/research/09finfocus.pdf.
 Cole, Rebel A. 2008. What do we know about the capital structure of privately held firms? Evidence from the Surveys of Small Business Finances. U.S. Small Business Administration Research Study No. 324. Available at http://www.sba.gov/ADVO/research/rs324tot.pdf.
 Cole, Rebel A. and Jonathan Dombrow. 2007. The state of rental housing in Cook County. Published by the MacArthur Foundation, Chicago, IL. Available at: http://ulichicago.org/PreservationCompact/Docs/The_State_of_Rental_Housing_Cook_County.pdf.
 Cole, Rebel A., Lawrence W. Goldberg and Lawrence J. White. 1999. Cookie-cutter versus character: The micro structure of small-business lending by large and small banks. In Business Access to Capital and Credit: A Federal Reserve System Research Conference, Federal Reserve Bank of Chicago. Available at: http://www.chicagofed.org/cedric/files/business_access_capital_full_proceedings.pdf.
 Cole, Rebel A. and Nicholas Walraven. 1998. Banking consolidation and the availability of credit to small businesses: Evidence from the 1993 National Survey of Small Businesses. In Consolidation in the Financial Services Industry, Proceedings of a conference sponsored by the Federal Reserve Bank of New York held March 27 in New York City, NY USA.  Available at:  http://www.newyorkfed.org/research/conference/1998/consolidation.html.
 Cole, Rebel A., John D. Wolken and R. Louise Woodburn. 1996. Bank and nonbank competition for small business credit: Evidence from the 1987 and 1993 National Surveys of Small Business Finances. Federal Reserve Bulletin 82, November. 983-995. Available at: http://www.federalreserve.gov/pubs/bulletin/1996/1196lead.pdf.
 Bhasin, Vijay, Rebel A. Cole and Joseph K. Kiely. 1996. REIT liquidity and bid-ask spreads. Real Estate Finance 13, Summer 1996. Reprinted in CFA Digest February 1997, Vol. 27, No. 1, 33-55. Available at: http://www.cfapubs.org/doi/abs/10.2469/dig.v27.n1.12.
 Cole, Rebel A. and Hamid Mehran. 1996. The effect of changes in ownership structure on firm performance. In Proceedings of a Conference on Bank Structure and Performance, Federal Reserve Bank of Chicago.
 Cole, Rebel A. and Jeffery W. Gunther. 1995. A CAMEL rating's shelf life. Financial Industry Studies, Federal Reserve Bank of Dallas, December. Available at: http://dallasfed.org/banking/fis/fis9502.pdf.
 Cole, Rebel A., Joseph A. McKenzie and Lawrence J. White. 1995. Deregulation gone awry: Moral hazard in the savings and loan industry. In Bank Failures: Causes, Consequences and Cures, edited by Michael S. Lawler and John H. Wood, Kluwer Academic Publishers: Norwell, MA. Available at: http://ssrn.com/abstract=1293468.
 Cole, Rebel A. and John D. Wolken. 1995. Financial services uses by small businesses: Evidence from the 1993 National Survey of Small Business Finances. Federal Reserve Bulletin 81 July. Board of Governors of the Federal Reserve System, Washington, DC. 629-667.
 Cole, Rebel A., Barbara G. Cornyn and Jeffery W. Gunther. 1995. FIMS: A new monitoring system for banking organizations. Federal Reserve Bulletin 81, January. Board of Governors of the Federal Reserve System, Washington, DC. 1-15.
 Cole, Rebel A. and Jeffery W. Gunther. 1994. When are failing banks closed? Financial Industry Studies, Federal Reserve Bank of Dallas, December. 1-12.
 Cole, Rebel A. and George W. Fenn. 1994. Did commercial real estate lending cause the banking crisis?” Real Estate Finance 11:3, Fall. 59-68.
 Cole, Rebel A. and Jeffery W. Gunther. 1993. Separating the likelihood and timing of bank failure Financial Industry Studies 93-2, Federal Reserve Bank of Dallas. Available at: http://econpapers.repec.org/paper/fipfeddfi/93-2.htm
 Cole, Rebel A. and George W. Fenn. 1992. Announcements of asset-quality problems and stock returns: The case of life insurance companies,” with George Fenn. In Proceedings of a Conference on Bank Structure and Performance, Federal Reserve Bank of Chicago.
 Cole, Rebel A. and Hamid Mehran. 1991. Executive compensation and corporate performance: Evidence from the thrift industry. In Proceedings of a Conference on Bank Structure and Performance, Federal Reserve Bank of Chicago. Available at: http://ssrn.com/abstract=1307382.
 Cole, Rebel A. 1990. Thrift resolution activities: Historical overview and implications. Financial Industry Studies, Federal Reserve Bank of Dallas, May 1990.  Reprinted in Annual Editions: Money and Banking, 1991. James P. Egan, editor, Guilford, CT: The Dushkin Publishing Group, Inc. Available at: http://condor.depaul.edu/rcole/Research/Cole_Implications_FIS_1990.PDF
 Cole, Rebel A., Joseph McKenzie, and Lawrence J. White. 1990. The causes and costs of thrift institution failures: a structure- behavior-outcomes approach. Financial Industry Studies 90-5, Federal Reserve Bank of Dallas. http://econpapers.repec.org/paper/fipfeddfi/90-5.htm
 Cole, Rebel A. 1990. Agency conflicts and thrift resolution costs. Financial Industry Studies 90-3, Federal Reserve Bank of Dallas. Available at: http://econpapers.repec.org/paper/fipfeddfi/90-3.htm
 Cole, Rebel A. 1990. Insolvency versus closure: why the regulatory delay in closing troubled thrifts? Financial Industry Studies 90-2, Federal Reserve Bank of Dallas. Available at: http://econpapers.repec.org/paper/fipfeddfi/90-2.htm
 Brown, Richard A., Joseph A. McKenzie, and Rebel A. Cole. Going beyond traditional mortgages: the portfolio performance of thrifts. Financial Industry Studies 90-1, Federal Reserve Bank of Dallas. Available at: http://econpapers.repec.org/paper/fipfeddfi/90-1.htm
 Cole, Rebel A. and Robert A. Eisenbeis. 1989. Value creation and excess returns in FSLIC-assisted takeovers of troubled thrifts. In Proceedings of a Conference on Bank Structure and Competition, Federal Reserve Bank of Chicago.
 Cole, Rebel A. and Robert A. Eisenbeis. 1989. Excess returns and sources of value in FSLIC-assisted acquisitions of troubled thrifts. Financial Industry Studies 90-2, Federal Reserve Bank of Dallas. Available at: http://econpapers.repec.org/paper/fipfeddfi/89-1.htm
 Cole, Rebel A. and Robert A. Eisenbeis. 1989. Value creation and excess returns in FSLIC-assisted takeovers of troubled thrifts. In Proceedings of a Conference on Bank Structure and Competition, Federal Reserve Bank of Chicago.

References

External links
 Rebel A. Cole webpages at Florida Atlantic University.
 Rebel A. Cole webpages at Social Science Research Network.
 Rebel A. Cole webpages at Mendeley.
 Rebel A. Cole webpages at Scholar Google.
 Rebel A. Cole webpages at ResearchGate.
 Rebel A. Cole webpages at REPEC.
 Rebel A. Cole webpages personal website.

Living people
1958 births
Florida Atlantic University faculty
DePaul University faculty
Academic staff of the University of New South Wales
Academic staff of the University of Auckland
People from Asheville, North Carolina
UNC Kenan–Flagler Business School alumni